The first government of Carlos Arias Navarro was formed on 4 January 1974, following the latter's appointment as Prime Minister of Spain by Head of State Francisco Franco on 29 December and his swearing-in on 2 January, as a result of Luis Carrero Blanco's assassination on 20 December 1973.

Arias Navarro's first cabinet was the last to serve under Franco, was made up of members from the different factions or "families" within the National Movement: mainly the FET y de las JONS party—the only legal political party during the Francoist regime—the military and a number of aligned-nonpartisan figures from the civil service, to be joined later on by the legally-recognized Spanish People's Union (UDPE). In the first cabinet since 1957 without the presence of any Opus Dei member, Arias Navarro went on to form a mostly bureaucratic government.

Council of Ministers
The Council of Ministers was structured into the offices for the prime minister, the three deputy prime ministers and 19 ministries.

Notes

References

Bibliography

External links
Governments. Dictatorship of Franco (18.07.1936 / 20.11.1975). CCHS–CSIC (in Spanish).
Governments of Franco. Dictatorship Chronology (1939–1975). Fuenterrebollo Portal (in Spanish).
The governments of the Civil War and Franco's dictatorship (1936–1975). Lluís Belenes i Rodríguez History Page (in Spanish).
Biographies. Royal Academy of History (in Spanish).

1974 establishments in Spain
1975 disestablishments in Spain
Cabinets established in 1974
Cabinets disestablished in 1975
Council of Ministers (Spain)